Sundown is the second and final album by the British pop group S Club 8. It was released in 2003 and went to number 13 on the UK Albums Chart.

The track "One Thing I Know" was co-written by the former Spice Girl Emma Bunton, who also provided backing vocals. The title track was also released by another 19 Management act, American Juniors.

Track listing

Charts

Certifications

References

2003 albums
S Club 8 albums
Polydor Records albums